Gilles Lehouillier is a Canadian politician and former civil servant. He is the current mayor of Lévis, Quebec. Lehouiller was previously the MNA for the riding of Lévis in the National Assembly of Quebec from 2008 to 2012. He is a member of the Quebec Liberal Party.

Lehouiller has a bachelor in communications and journalism from the Université Laval. He was involved in municipal politics particularly in the City of Lévis. He was a member of the executive council, member of various committees, vice-president of the Réseau Trans-Sud transit corporation and member of the executive committee for the economic promotion of the Quebec City metropolitan area. He also worked as a provincial public servant including as regional director for the Ministry of Municipal and Regional Affairs and had various duties related to communications agent.

He was elected mayor of Lévis in the 2013 Quebec Municipal elections on November 3, 2013, for his party, Lévis Force 10.

References

External links
 
 Liberal Party biography 

Living people
Quebec Liberal Party MNAs
Université Laval alumni
Mayors of Lévis, Quebec
21st-century Canadian politicians
Year of birth missing (living people)